The Rock Island Spur of Katy Trail State Park is a state park in the U.S. state of Missouri that is   rails to trails hiking and biking trail.  Work on the trail was completed and the trail was opened on December 10, 2016 .  The trail provides residents of the Kansas City region direct trail access to the  Katy Trail State Park, the longest rails to trails trail in the U.S.  The Rock Island Trail uses "abandoned" (embargoed and out of service) right-of-way of the Chicago, Rock Island and Pacific Railroad between Pleasant Hill in Cass County and Windsor in Henry County where it meets the Katy Trail.

An additional  of Rock Island right-of-way is in the process of rail banking by the Surface Transportation Board. Missouri State Parks is evaluating adding this additional 144 miles to the Rock Island Trail, extending it from Windsor to Beaufort.  On December 19, 2019, the state signed an Interim Trail Use Agreement with Missouri Central Railroad Company, the Ameren subsidiary that owns the corridor.  The agreement paves the way for transfer of the right-of-way to the state if certain conditions can be met by December 31, 2021, including identifying approximately 9.8 million dollars of funding. 

In May 2016, Jackson County, Missouri acquired  of right-of-way from  the Union Pacific Railroad, of section of line from the Truman Sports Complex to south part of Lee's Summit, to bring the trail into Kansas City. Work began in 2017, with the first half opened in 2018. There currently is a gap between Lee's Summit/Greenwood and Pleasant Hill, with the route unknown at this time.

Route 
The Rock Island Spur currently starts in Windsor at mile marker 216.5. It heads northwest, passing through Johnson County until it reaches its western terminus in Pleasant Hill at mile marker 262.9.

See also 
 Freeburg Tunnel

References

External links
Rock Island Spur of Katy Trail State Park Missouri Department of Natural Resources
Rock Island Trail in MO 	BikeRockIsland and TrailHub (maps, mileage, and other Rock Island Trail usage tools)

Rail trails in Missouri
Bike paths in Missouri
State parks of Missouri
Chicago, Rock Island and Pacific Railroad
Protected areas of Johnson County, Missouri
Protected areas of Henry County, Missouri
Protected areas of Cass County, Missouri